The Princeton Tigers men's lacrosse team represents Princeton University in NCAA Division I men's lacrosse play. Princeton currently competes as a member of the Ivy League and plays its home games at the Class of 1952 Stadium in Princeton, New Jersey.

Prior to the NCAA Men's Lacrosse Championship tournament, Princeton was voted as national champion six times, in 1884, 1885, 1937, 1942, 1951, and 1953. Princeton also went undefeated in Ivy League play from 1957 to 1963 (Ivy League lacrosse began in 1956), and tied with Harvard in 1960 in an otherwise perfect season. Between 1957 and 1965, the team won nine consecutive Ivy League titles. The team has since won ten consecutive Ivy League titles from 1995 through 2004.  Between 1990 and 2003, Princeton appeared in 14 consecutive NCAA tournaments.

Since 1990, Princeton has won six NCAA national championships and has qualified for 20 of 31 Division I NCAA Men's Lacrosse Championship tournaments (but none since 2012). All six championships were won under former head coach Bill Tierney, who coached the team from 1988 to 2009. Tierney also led the Princeton program to two second-place finishes. In 2010, Chris Bates took over as head coach of the Princeton program. In 2010, Princeton won the inaugural Ivy League Lacrosse Tournament.

History
Princeton has been voted national champion six times (1884, 1885, 1937, 1942, 1951 and 1953). Some sources regard 1937 as the first national championship.  Men's lacrosse has been contested in the Ivy League since 1956, initially with only six teams. Brown University began competing in the league in 1964 and Columbia University has never competed in the league. Between 1957 and 1965, Princeton won nine consecutive Ivy League championships. It had undefeated 5–0 conference records every year from 1957 to 1963 except 1960 when it had a tie with Harvard.  Between 1967 and 1992 Princeton won no Ivy League championships, while Cornell was the dominant conference power. Until the 1990s, Princeton played at Finney Field. Princeton won seven more Ivy League championships in the 1990s including perfect 6–0 records in 1992, 1993, 1996, 1997, 1998 and 1999. 1997 is regarded as the best in school history with a record number of wins during its 15–0 season and 10 All-Americans plus 13 All-Ivy League selections.  Including the 2010 season, Princeton has earned 25 Ivy League championships, the only Ivy League tournament championship to date, 19 NCAA Division I Championship appearances, and 6 NCAA championships.

Their main Ivy League rivalry is with Cornell. On the non-conference slate is the annual rivalry with Johns Hopkins, first played in 1890 and a constant national fixture since the 1990s. Princeton also plays Rutgers for the Meistrell Cup in honor of Harland (Tots) Meistrell who restarted the dormant lacrosse program at Rutgers in 1920 and then restarted the dormant lacrosse program at Princeton in 1921.

Princeton has had a Top VIII Award winner and two Lt. Raymond Enners Awards for national player of the year.  The school has seven Ivy League Players of the Year and nine Ivy League Rookies of the Year. The team has also had numerous national position awardees: five Ensign C. Markland Kelly, Jr. Awards (goaltenders), three Jack Turnbull Awards (attackman), two McLaughlin Awards (midfielder), and  six Schmeisser Awards (defenseman). Two Princeton head coaches have won the F. Morris Touchstone Award. Princeton's first first team All-American in 1922.

Championships
From 1936 through 1970, the United States Intercollegiate Lacrosse Association (USILA) awarded the Wingate Memorial Trophy to the annual champion, based on regular-season records. In 1971, the NCAA began hosting an annual men's tournament to determine the national champion. The Wingate Memorial Trophy was presented to the first two NCAA Division I champions (1971 and 1972) and was then retired.

NCAA Tournament History
The following is the complete history of the Princeton Tigers men's lacrosse in the NCAA Division I Men's Lacrosse Championship.

Honors
The following players have been recognized with conference or national honors and awards for their play:

Top VIII Award
 Josh Sims (2000)

Lt. Raymond Enners Award (Player of the Year)
 David Morrow (1993)
 Scott Bacigalupo(1994)

Schmeisser Award (Defenseman of the Year)
 Tyler Campbell (1942)
 Fred Allner, Jr. (1947)
 David Morrow (1992, 1993)
 Christian Cook (1998)
 Ryan Mollett (2001)

McLaughlin Award (Midfielder of the Year)
 Josh Sims (1998, 2000)

Jack Turnbull Award (Attackman of the Year)
 Don Hahn (1951)
 Kevin Lowe (1994)
 Jon Hess (1997)

Ensign C. Markland Kelly, Jr. Award (Goaltender of the Year)
 Scott Bacigalupo (1992, 1993, 1994)
 Trevor Tierney (2001)
 Alex Hewit (2006)

Ivy League Men's Player of the Year
 Kevin Lowe, A (1994)
 Jesse Hubbard, A (1996)
 Jon Hess, A (1997)
 Josh Sims, M (2000)
 Ryan Mollett, D (2001)
 Ryan Boyle, A (2002, 2004)

Ivy League Men's Rookie of the Year
 Torr Marro, M (1990)
 Scott Bacigalupo, G (1991)
 Jesse Hubbard, M (1995)
 B. J. Prager, A (1999)
 Ryan Boyle, A (2001)
 Peter Trombino, A (2004)
 Dan Cocoziello, D (2005)
 Jack McBride, A (2008)
 Mike Chanenchuk, M (2010)
 Tom Schreiber, M (2011)

Three-time All-Ivy
 Phil Allen (1960-61-620
 Dave Tickner (1975-76-77)
 Scott Bacigalupo (1991-92-93)
 David Morrow (1991-92-93)
 Kevin Lowe (1992-93-94)
 Jesse Hubbard (1996-97-98)
 Josh Sims (1998-99-00)
 B.J. Prager (1999-00-02)

NCAA Tournament Most Outstanding Player
 Scott Bacigalupo (1992, 1994)
 Jon Hess (1997)
 Corey Popham (1998)
 B.J. Prager (2001)

Two-time All-Americans
 Charles W. B. Wardell, Jr. (1934–35)
 M. Tyler Campbell (1941–42)
 Leonard M. Gaines, Jr. (1946–47)
 Frederick A. Allner, Jr. (1947–48)
 Donald P. Hahn (1950–51)
 Douglas G. Levick III (1957–58)
 Timothy C. Callard (1962–63)
 John D. Baker (1966–67)
 Scott S. Bacigalupo (1992-93-94)
 David K. Morrow (1992–93)
 Todd B. Higgins (1994–95)
 Jesse H. Hubbard (1996, 1998)
 Jonathan A. Hess (1997–98)
 Joshua S. Sims (1998-99-2000)
 Ryan J. Boyle (2003–04)

CoSIDA Academic All-America
First Team
 Tom Barnds (1990)
 Justin Tortolani (1991, 1992)
 Josh Sims (2000)

Second Team
 Scott Reinhardt (1994)
 Josh Sims (1999)

National Lacrosse Hall of Fame
National Lacrosse Hall of Fame inductees:

Statistical accomplishments
Michael Sowers holds the school career scoring record with 302 points (2017–20), as well as the single-season record with 90 (2019). Jesse Hubbard holds the career record for goals scored with 163 (1995–98), while Gavin McBride holds the single season record with 54 (2015). Sowers also holds the career assists record with 181, and the single-season record with 56 (2018). Scott Bacigalupo holds the career saves record with 732 (1991–94), while William Cronin holds the single-season record with 277 (1973).

Matt Bailer holds the NCAA Division I record for face-off percentage as one of nine players to have won all of his face-offs in a game where he participated in 10 or more (12 face-offs, 4/15/00, vs. Harvard). No other Tigers currently hold records, but Trevor Tierney formerly held the single-season goals against average (2001–2006, 5.70) and career goals against average (2001–2006, 6.65) NCAA records, while Kevin Gray held the career saves per game record (1977–1994, 15.64) and William Cronin held the career saves per game (1974–1977, 14.43) record.

Numerous Tiger lacrosse players have been NCAA national statistical champions. Ryan Boyle leads the way as a former champion in several statistics: points per game (2003, 4.54), assists per game (2003, 3.77), assists per game (2004, 2.93), assists (2003, 49), assists (2004, 44). Trevor Tierney was twice a national statistical champion: goals against average (2001, 5.70) and save percentage (2001, .671). Additionally, Jon Hess (assists per game, 1998, 2.60), Patrick Cairns (goals against average, 1997, 6.44) and Corey Popham (goals against average, 1999, 7.07) have been national statistical champions.

The team has also led the nation on several occasions, including the following: scoring defense (1997, 6.87; 1998, 7.60; 1999, 7.15; 2001, 5.80; 2007, 6.21), scoring margin (1996, 8.27; 1998, 6.87) and winning percentage (1997, 15–0 – 1.000, 1998, 14–1 – .933, 2001, 14–1 – .933).  The Princeton teams of the late 1990s were second only to the Cornell teams of the 1970s in terms of consecutive victories: consecutive victories: (3/16/96-3/7/98, 29, Cornell-42) and consecutive conference victories: (4/29/95-3/30/02, 37, Cornell-39).

In addition to national records, Princeton holds the following Ivy League records based on conference play. Ryan Boyle holds several individual conference records: single-season assists (32, 2003), career assists (86, 2001–04) and career points (120, 2001–04).  The team holds conference records for single-game goals allowed (1, vs Penn, 1970) and single-season goals allowed (12, 1957).

Season Results
The following is a list of Princeton's results by season as an NCAA Division I program:

{| class="wikitable"

|- align="center"

†NCAA canceled 2020 collegiate activities due to the COVID-19 virus.
Matt Madalon took over the head coaching position on the 9th game of the 2016 season. Chris Bates' 2–6 (0–3) mark from that season has been credited to his overall record, while Matt Madalon's 3–2 (2–1) mark has been credited to his overall record.

References

External links
 

 
1882 establishments in New Jersey
Lacrosse clubs established in 1882